Giorgio Lopez (16 February 1947 – 10 August 2021) was an Italian actor and voice actor.

Biography
Born in Naples, Lopez began his career during the late 1960s. He was best remembered for his work on stage, acting in and directing theatre adaptations of plays such as Mother Courage and Her Children. He was also widely known as a voice actor. He was the official Italian voice of Danny DeVito, John Cleese and he had also been the official voice of Dustin Hoffman since the death of Ferruccio Amendola in 2001.

Lopez had also dubbed the voices of characters portrayed by Groucho Marx, John Hurt, Ian Holm and Bob Hoskins. His character roles include Garrick Ollivander in the Harry Potter films, Geoffrey Butler in The Fresh Prince of Bel-Air, King Harold in the Shrek movies, Mr. Miyagi in The Karate Kid and he has been the official voice of Scrooge McDuck from 1995 until his death, replacing Gigi Angelillo.

Lopez served as a dubbing director for several of Italian dubbed animated films and cartoons.

Personal life
Lopez was the father of voice actors Gabriele and Andrea Lopez. He was also the older brother of voice actor and Trio member Massimo Lopez.

Death
Lopez died in Rome on the morning of 10 August 2021, at the age of 74, after suffering of an undisclosed illness.

Dubbing roles

Animation
Scrooge McDuck in All Disney Productions (1995–2021)
King Harold in Shrek 2, Shrek the Third, Shrek Forever After
Lord Rogers in The Swan Princess, The Swan Princess: Escape from Castle Mountain, The Swan Princess: The Mystery of the Enchanted Kingdom
McSquizzy in Open Season, Open Season 2, Open Season 3
Adventure in The Pagemaster
Albus Dumbledore in The Lego Movie
Buck "Ace" Cluck in Chicken Little
Kekata in Pocahontas
Reverend Clement Hedges in Wallace & Gromit: The Curse of the Were-Rabbit
Mayor of Halloween Town in The Nightmare Before Christmas
Lil' Lightning in 101 Dalmatians II: Patch's London Adventure
King Gristle Sr. in Trolls
Ooblar in Jimmy Neutron: Boy Genius
Narrator in The Land Before Time
Itchy Itchiford in All Dogs Go to Heaven
Luong Lao Shi in American Dragon: Jake Long
Ranger Smith in Yogi's Treasure Hunt
Scruffy Scruffington in Futurama (seasons 6-7)
Boulanger in The Boxtrolls
Grandsanta in Arthur Christmas
Boris Goosinoff in Balto
Pretty Boy in Teacher's Pet

Live action
Frank Stedman in Head Office
Owen Lift in Throw Momma from the Train
Vincent Benedict in Twins
Lawrence Garfield in Other People's Money
The Penguin in Batman Returns
Robert Ciaro in Hoffa
John Leary in Jack the Bear
Dr. Larry Arbogast in Junior
Harry Wormwood / Narrator in Matilda
Rude Gambler in Mars Attacks!
Sid Hudgens in L.A. Confidential
Deck Shifflet in The Rainmaker
Pat Francato in Living Out Loud
George Shapiro in Man on the Moon
Chief Wyatt Rash in Drowning Mona
Max Fairbanks in What's the Worst That Could Happen?
Mickey Bergman in Heist
Danny DeVito in Austin Powers in Goldmember
Harvey Wexler in Anything Else
Amos Calloway in Big Fish
Brad in Christmas in Love
Walter in Even Money
Frank Menure in Relative Strangers
Big D in 10 Items or Less
Buddy Hall in Deck the Halls
Frank Reynolds in It's Always Sunny in Philadelphia
Mel in The Good Night
District attorney in Reno 911!: Miami
George Gastner in Nobel Son
Tom Cathkart in House Broken
Jimmy Marino in Solitary Man
Al Russo in When in Rome
Max Medici in Dumbo
Eddie Gilpin in Jumanji: The Next Level
Danny Snyder in Sleepers
Stanley Motss in Wag the Dog
The Conscience in The Messenger: The Story of Joan of Arc
Ben Floss in Moonlight Mile
Winston King in Confidence
Wendell Rohr in Runaway Jury
Bernie Focker in Meet the Fockers
Bernie Focker in Little Fockers
Critic in Lemony Snicket's A Series of Unfortunate Events
Meyer Lansky in The Lost City
Giuseppe Baldini in Perfume: The Story of a Murderer
Dustin Hoffman in The Holiday
Jules Hilbert in Stranger than Fiction
Edward Magorium in Mr. Magorium's Wonder Emporium
Izzy Panofsky in Barney's Version
Abraham Simkin in The Cobbler
Archie Leach in A Fish Called Wanda
John Langston in Silverado
Rollo Lee in Fierce Creatures
Donald P. Sinclair in Rat Race
R in The World Is Not Enough
Q in Die Another Day
Mr. Munday in Charlie's Angels: Full Throttle
John Cleese's roles in Monty Python's The Meaning of Life (2004 redub)
James in The Adventures of Pluto Nash
Grizzled sergeant in Around the World in 80 Days
Dr. Primkin in Man About Town
Charles Dreyfus in The Pink Panther 2
Mr. Miyagi in The Karate Kid, The Karate Kid Part II, The Karate Kid Part III, in The Next Karate Kid
Geoffrey Butler in The Fresh Prince of Bel-Air
Joseph Yoshinobu Takagi in Die Hard
Pappy O'Daniel in O Brother, Where Art Thou?
Garrick Ollivander in Harry Potter and the Philosopher's Stone, Harry Potter and the Deathly Hallows – Part 1, Harry Potter and the Deathly Hallows – Part 2

References

External links

1947 births
2021 deaths
Male actors from Naples
Theatre people from Naples
Sapienza University of Rome alumni
Accademia Nazionale di Arte Drammatica Silvio D'Amico alumni
Italian male film actors
Italian male stage actors
Italian male television actors
Italian male voice actors
Italian theatre directors
Italian voice directors
Italian people of Spanish descent
20th-century Italian male actors
21st-century Italian male actors